Czechoslovakia competed at the 1988 Winter Olympics in Calgary, Alberta, Canada.

Competitors
The following is the list of number of competitors in the Games.

Medalists

Alpine skiing

Men

Men's combined

Women

Women's combined

Biathlon

Cross-country skiing

Men

Women

Figure skating

Ice hockey

 Squad:
 Goalkeepers: Petr Bříza, Dominik Hašek, Jaromír Šindel
 Defenders: Jaroslav Benák, Mojmír Božík, Miloslav Hořava, Antonín Stavjaňa, Rudolf Suchánek, Bedřich Ščerban, Eduard Uvíra
 Forwards: Jiří Doležal, Oto Haščák, Jiří Hrdina, Jiří Lála, Igor Liba, Dušan Pašek, Radim Raděvič, Vladimír Růžička, Petr Rosol, Jiří Šejba, Petr Vlk, Rostislav Vlach, David Volek
 Coaches: Ján Starší, František Pospíšil

First Round

Group B

 lost to  1-2 (goal: Hrdina)
 beat  7-5 (goals: Pašek 2, Stavjaňa 2, Rosol, Růžička, Liba)
 beat  10-1 (goals: Pašek 2, Benák, Lála, Liba, Volek, Hrdina, Stavjaňa, Suchánek, Vlk)
 beat  4-0 (goals: Hořava, Šejba, Božík, Pašek)
 lost to  1-6 (goal: Lála)

Final Round

 lost to  2-6 (goals: Haščák, Růžička)
 beat  5-2 (goals: Liba 2, Šejba, Pašek, Růžička)
 lost to  3-6 (goals: Stavjaňa, Šejba, Růžička)

Luge

Nordic combined

Ski jumping

Speed skating

Men

References

Official Olympic Reports
International Olympic Committee results database

Nations at the 1988 Winter Olympics
1988
Winter Olympics